The Peleset (Egyptian: pwrꜣsꜣtj) or Pulasati were one of the several ethnic groups the Sea Peoples were said to be composed of, appearing in fragmentary historical and iconographic records in ancient Egyptian from the Eastern Mediterranean in the late 2nd millennium BC.

Earliest records

During the Bronze Age collapse, a seafaring coalition known as the Sea Peoples are recorded as conducting a number of raids and invasions in the East Mediterranean. After sacking numerous empires along the basin, the Sea Peoples engaged Ancient Egypt during the reign of Ramesses III, most famously at the Battle of the Delta, during which the invading force was decimated by the Egyptian army. One such group of the Sea Peoples recorded as participating in the Battle of the Delta were the Peleset, who, according to Ramesses' own mortuary temple at Medinet Habu, were forcefully relocated by the pharaoh to southern Canaan, which at that time was upon the frontiers of the Egyptian Empire. Archaeology has not been able to corroborate this apparent mass-relocation of the Peleset.

After this point in time, the Sea Peoples as a whole disappear from historical records, the Peleset being no exception.

Identity and origins

Today, historians generally identify the Peleset with the Philistines, or rather, vice versa. The origins of the Peleset, like much of the Sea Peoples, are not universally agreed upon - with that said, scholars have generally concluded that the bulk of the clans originated in the greater Southern European area, including western Asia Minor, the Aegean, and the islands of the Mediterranean. Fellow Sea Peoples clans have likewise been identified with various Mediterranean polities, to varying acceptance: the Ekwesh with the Achaens, the Denyen with the Danaans, the Lukka with the Lycians, the Shekelesh with the Sicels, the Sherden with the Sardinians, etc. The geographical confluence of the Sea Peoples' origins in the Aegean area implies the Peleset had similar origins.

Furthering an identification of the Peleset as the Philistines are the Biblical description of the people hailing from Caphtor, generally identified as Crete, and the presence of a distinctly Mycenean ceramic culture found at numerous Philistine archaeology sites. Likewise, a 2019 genetic study performed on a number of skeletons uncovered in a Philistine cemetery in Ashkelon found that the city's early Iron Age population was genetically distinct from the local Semitic-speaking Levantine population due to a European-related admixture; this genetic signal became undetectable in the later Iron Age as interbreeding and assimilation of these individuals reached its natural conclusion. According to the authors, the admixture was likely due to a "gene flow from a European-related gene pool" during the Bronze to Iron Age transition, which supports the theory that a migration event occurred.

Older sources sometimes identify the Peleset with the Pelasgians. However, this identification has numerous problems and is usually disregarded by modern scholars. A major issue is the etymological difficulties of the "g" in "Pelasgians" becoming a "t" in the Egyptian translation, especially as the Philistine endonym already corresponded to the form P-L-S-T and therefore required no such modification to be rendered as Peleset in the Egyptian language.

See also
 Timeline of the name Palestine

References

Sea Peoples
Ancient peoples
Philistines
Pelasgians